Iris filifolia is a species in the genus Iris, it is also in the subgenus Xiphium. 
It is a bulbous perennial from North Africa and Europe. It has thin leaves, summer flowers in shades of red-purple.

Description
It has 3 mm wide leaves, which appear in the autumn.
It normally reaches a height of 10-16 inches (or 25–40 cm). But can reach up to 45 cm tall.
It flowers between March and June. Normally more than 2 flowers per stem. When the flowering shoot comes out of the ground it is covered in a purple or white blotched sheath. These then open up to revel red-purple flowers with orange spots, or yellow stripe on the falls.

Biochemistry
As most irises are diploid, having two sets of chromosomes, this can be used to identify hybrids and classification of groupings. It has a chromosome count: 2n=32.

Taxonomy
Its name means 'thread-leaved iris'.

In Gibraltar, it is also known as the 'Narrow-leaved Purple Iris'.

It is often mistakenly called 'Spanish Iris'. The Spanish Iris is Iris xiphium.

In 1842, it was first described by Pierre Edmond Boissier in 'Voyage botanique en Espagne' Vol 2, on page 602. Dykes notes that this description is incorrect. It was also described in Curtis's Botanical Magazine No.5929 as 'Xiphion filifolium'.

It was recorded in the Catalogue of Life in 2011, and it was verified by United States Department of Agriculture Agricultural Research Service on 4 April 2003, and updated on 14 November 2005.

Distribution and habitat
It is native to temperate regions of North Africa and Europe.

Range

It is found within Africa, in Morocco, (near Tangier,) and within Europe, in Southwestern Spain, and in Gibraltar.

Habitat
Iris filifolia likes to grow in sandy areas.

Cultivation
It is best grown in a bulb frame in the UK.

It is known to be toxic like other bulbs in the genus.

Cultivars
Several known cultivars are;
 'A. Bloemaard' (dark blue)
 'Filifolia'  
 'Filifolia Alba' 
 'Filifolia Elizabeth' 
 'Filifolia Imperator' 
 'Filifolia Praecox' 
 'Latifolia'  
 'Queen Of Gazelles' 
 'Rex'

Hybrids
 Iris filifolia var. latifolia (Foster) wide leaved variant  
 Iris filifolia var. filifolia (Boiss) and thread-like leaved variant,

References

Other sources
 Fennane, M. & M. I. Tattou 1998. Catalogue des plantes vasculaires rares, menacées ou endémiques du Maroc (Bocconea) 8:205.
 Jahandiez, E. & R. Maire Catalogue des plantes du Maroc. 1931-1941 (L Maroc)
 Maire, R. C. J. E. et al. Flore de l'Afrique du Nord. 1952- (F Afr Nord)
 Mathew, B. The Iris. 1981 (Iris) 136.
 Tutin, T. G. et al., eds. Flora europaea. 1964-1980 (F Eur)

External links

filifolia
Plants described in 1842
Flora of Spain
Flora of Gibraltar
Flora of Morocco
Flora of Europe
Taxa named by Pierre Edmond Boissier